Bavarian B I engines were  steam locomotives of the Royal Bavarian State Railways (Königlich Bayerische Staatsbahn).

The Class B I was developed in parallel with the Class A II, but had a coupled axle instead of a second carrying axle. As a result, it developed a higher tractive effort. It also had a Stephenson Long Boiler, forked frame and an outside Stephenson valve gear with outside cylinders. The coupling rods were based on an American prototype. Later many of the engines were fitted with a Crampton boiler.

They were coupled to 3 T 4.2, and later 3 T 5, tenders.

See also
 List of Bavarian locomotives and railbuses

2-4-0 locomotives
B 01
Standard gauge locomotives of Germany
Railway locomotives introduced in 1847
1B n2 locomotives
Passenger locomotives